Goode is an unincorporated community between Bedford and Forest in Bedford County, Virginia, United States. Its name honors John Goode, a Virginia politician.  Its ZIP Code is 24556. It is largely made up of rolling hills, farmlands, and views of the Blue Ridge Mountains. The 2020 US census reported a population of 3,388.

Bellevue was listed on the National Register of Historic Places in 1990.

Geography

Major Highways

Rivers
 Big Otter River

References

Unincorporated communities in Bedford County, Virginia